Mado is a 1976 French drama film directed by Claude Sautet.

Cast
 Michel Piccoli : Simon Léotard
 Ottavia Piccolo : Mado
 Jacques Dutronc : Pierre
 Charles Denner : Reynald Manecca
 Romy Schneider : Hélène
 Julien Guiomar : Lépidon
 Claude Dauphin : Vaudable
 Michel Aumont : Aimé Barachet
 Jean Bouise : André
 André Falcon : Mathelin
 Bernard Fresson : Julien 
 Benoît Allemane : Antoine 
 Nathalie Baye : Catherine  
 Daniel Russo : Roger
 Dominique Zardi : Crovetto
 Denise Filiatrault : Lucienne
 Nicolas Vogel : Maxime

External links
 

1976 drama films
1976 films
French drama films
Films directed by Claude Sautet
Films scored by Philippe Sarde
Films about suicide
1970s French films